Seriguda is a village and panchayat in Rangareddy district, Telangana TS, India. It comes under Ibrahimpatnam mandal.

It is 27 km away from Hyderabad city. The Outer Ring Road, Hyderabad is 7 km from the village. Rajiv Gandhi International Airport is 40 km away.

References

Villages in Ranga Reddy district